Dowlatabad (also Romanized as Dowlatābād and Daulatābād; also known as Dowlat Abad Mo”men Abad) is a village in Jolgeh-e Mazhan Rural District, Jolgeh-e Mazhan District, Khusf County, South Khorasan Province, Iran. At the 2006 census, its population was 578, in 124 families.

References 

Populated places in Khusf County